Lennart Rodhe (November 15, 1916 – January 17, 2005) was a Swedish artist, painter and printmaker.

Lennart Rodhe enrolled as a student in 1934 at Edward Berggrens studio at Tekniska skolan in Stockholm, and studied under Peter Rostrup-Boyesen i Copenhagen and at the Royal University College of Fine Arts in Stockholm 1938–44 with Sven X:et Erixon as teacher. He also studied anatomy at Kunstakademiet i Köpenhamn.
Lennart Rodhe is considered one of the most prominent of the Swedish modernists, notable as a professor at Royal University College of Fine Arts in Stockholm, as someone who strongly influenced his students, such as Peter Dahl and Olle Bauman, although his strict methods of education based on the study of model drawing scared off some students.

He was also a member of 1947 års män (the men of the year 1947), who in 1947 exhibited at the exhibition Ung konst at Gallery Färg och Form at Brunkebergstorg in Stockholm. He was awarded the Prince Eugen Medal for painting in 1967.

Books 
Lennart Rodhe, by Ulf Linde, Bonniers små konstböcker 2, Stockholm, Sweden 1962
Lennart Rodhe, by Thomas Millroth, Sveriges Allmänna Konstförenings publikation 98, Stockholm, Sweden 1989, 
Lennart Rodhe, Atlantis, Stockholm, Sweden 1990, 
Rumsbildning, by Lars-Göran Oredsson, Kalejdoskop, Åhus, Sweden 1991, 
Rodhe som Grafiker, by Börje Magnusson och Thomas Millroth, Stockholm, Sweden 1993, 
Bagateller, by Per Bjurström, Carlsson Bokförlag, Stockholm, Sweden 1995, 
Blockteckningar och reseskisser, by Per Bjurström, Carlsson Bokförlag, Stockholm, Sweden 1995, 
Kyrkogården - Växthuset, by Per Bjurström, Carlsson Bokförlag, Stockholm, Sweden 1997,

References

1916 births
2005 deaths
20th-century Swedish painters
Swedish male painters
21st-century Swedish painters
Artists from Stockholm
Recipients of the Prince Eugen Medal
Burials at Uppsala old cemetery
20th-century Swedish male artists
21st-century Swedish male artists